The 2013 Michigan Wolverines football team, sometimes known as Team 134 in reference to the 134-year tradition of the Michigan football program, represented the University of Michigan in the sport of college football during the 2013 NCAA Division I FBS football season. The Wolverines played in the Legends Division of the Big Ten Conference and played their home games at Michigan Stadium in Ann Arbor, Michigan. The team was led by head coach Brady Hoke, who was in his third season.

Michigan began the year with five consecutive victories, including a 41–30 victory over rival Notre Dame in just the second night game in Michigan Stadium history. The game set the all-time record for largest crowd attending an American football game at 115,109. However, in their sixth game, the Wolverines were upset on the road by unranked Penn State in four overtimes. Michigan went on to lose five of their final six games, eventually dropping out of the AP poll, ending with a loss to Kansas State in the 2013 Buffalo Wild Wings Bowl. The season ended with a record of 7–6 overall, 3–5 in conference play.

The Wolverines were led on offense by quarterback Devin Gardner, who led the team with 2,960 passing yards and 32 total touchdowns (22 passing and 11 rushing). Wide receiver Jeremy Gallon finished second in the Big Ten with 1,373 receiving yards.

Preseason
The 2012 team compiled an 8–5 record under second-year head coach Brady Hoke and faced South Carolina in the Outback Bowl, losing 33–28 on a last-minute touchdown. Michigan lost four games to teams that were ranked in the top ten of the AP Poll.

On March 20, the team announced that returning starting linebacker Jake Ryan suffered a torn ACL and was listed as out indefinitely. On April 1, the team announced that backup quarterback Russell Bellomy had also suffered a torn ACL and would be out indefinitely. On May 7, the team announced that punter Will Hagerup had been reinstated to the team following a suspension for a violation of team rules, but would sit out the season. On August 21, the team announced that wide receiver Amara Darboh would miss the season with a foot injury.

Michigan returns 13 out of 22 starters — six on offense and seven on defense. Michigan will be forced to replace captains quarterback Denard Robinson and safety Jordan Kovacs, as well as starters defensive end Craig Roh, linebacker Kenny Demens, defensive tackle Will Campbell, cornerback J.T. Floyd, center Elliott Mealer, offensive guards Patrick Omameh and Ricky Barnum, tight end Mike Kwiatkowski, and wide receiver Roy Roundtree. Back-up running back Vincent Smith also departed due to graduation. Taylor Lewan, however, decided to return for his senior season.

Recruiting

Position key

Recruits
Michigan's recruiting class was ranked No. 2 by Scout, No. 5 by Rivals, and No. 6 by ESPN. The program received 27 letters of intent on National Signing Day, February 6, 2013.

Rankings
Michigan began the season ranked No. 17 in both the AP and Coaches' Polls, and remained there following its week one victory over Central Michigan. Michigan rose to No. 11 in the AP Poll and No. 12 in the Coaches' Poll after its victory over Notre Dame, but fell to No. 15 in the AP Poll and No. 14 in the Coaches' Poll following its narrow victory over Akron, and then fell again to No. 18 in the AP Poll and No. 17 in the Coaches' Poll following its narrow victory over Connecticut.

*Source: ESPN.com: 2013 NCAA Football Rankings

Schedule
 Source:

‡ New Michigan Stadium Attendance Record, Former NCAA Attendance Record (September 7, 2013 – September 10, 2016)

Radio
Radio coverage for all games will be broadcast statewide on The Michigan Wolverines Football Network and on Sirius XM Satellite Radio. The radio announcers are Frank Beckmann with play-by-play, Jim Brandstatter with color commentary, and Doug Karsch with sideline reports. This was Beckmann's 32nd and final season in the Michigan press box; he retired from sportscasting afterward.

Game summaries

vs. Central Michigan

Sources:

    
    
    
    
    
    
    
    
    
    
    

To open the season, Michigan faced the Central Michigan Chippewas. This was the first meeting since 2006, when the game incurred a lightning delay, which was Michigan Stadium's first ever weather delay. Michigan won that game 41–17. Starting safety Thomas Gordon was suspended for the game for a violation of team rules.

Michigan dominated the game, winning 59–9. Michigan opened the scoring in the first quarter when Joe Reynolds returned a blocked punt 30 yards for a touchdown, but Central Michigan responded with a 23-yard field goal from Ron Coluzzi. Michigan ended the scoring in the first quarter with a Devin Gardner 22-yard touchdown run, making the score 14–3. Michigan outscored Central Michigan 21–3 in the second quarter. Fitzgerald Toussaint rushed one-yard for a touchdown before Coluzzi added another field goal for Central Michigan, this time from a distance of 27 yards. Michigan ended the scoring in the first half with a 21-yard touchdown pass from Gardner to Jeremy Gallon and a four-yard touchdown run from Gardner, making the score 35–6 at halftime. Michigan outscored Central Michigan 21–0 in the third quarter via a two-yard touchdown run from Toussaint, a one-yard run from Derrick Green, and a five-yard touchdown run from Thomas Rawls, which made the score 56–6. The teams traded field goals in the fourth quarter, a 33-yard one from Coluzzi for Central Michigan and a 30-yard one from Brendan Gibbons for Michigan to end the scoring.

Michigan's 59 points were the most scored by a Michigan football team in its season opener since 1905—when Michigan defeated Ohio Wesleyan 65–0—and were also the most points scored against a team since Michigan defeated Massachusetts 63–13 in 2012. The blocked punt returned for a touchdown in the first quarter was Michigan's first blocked punt returned for a touchdown since 2009, when Brandon Graham returned one against Delaware State. Michigan's defense recorded four sacks, which matched the previous season's high against Ohio State. 27 freshman made their debuts for Michigan during the game. Backup running back Drake Johnson suffered a torn ACL during the game and will miss the remainder of the season.

vs. Notre Dame

Sources:

    
    
    
    
    
    
    
    
    
    
    
    

Following its game against Central, Michigan hosted the Notre Dame Fighting Irish. Notre Dame won the previous meeting 13–6. Billed as "Under the Lights II", this was the second night game in Michigan Stadium's history; the previous game also featured Notre Dame. Tom Harmon was honored as a Michigan Football Legend, and his #98 jersey was unretired and given to quarterback Devin Gardner.

Michigan won the game, 41–30. Michigan opened the scoring in the first quarter with a 44-yard field goal from Brendan Gibbons and added a 61-yard touchdown pass from Devin Gardner to Jeremy Gallon to expand its lead to 10–0. Notre Dame answered with a seven-yard touchdown pass from Tommy Rees to T. J. Jones, making the score at the end of the first quarter 10–7 in favor of Michigan. Notre Dame tied the game in the second quarter with a 44-yard field goal from Kyle Brindza, but Michinga regained the via a two-yard touchdown run from Devin Gardner. After Notre Dame cut Michigan's lead to four via a 24-yard field goal from Brindza, Michigan scored ten unanswered points to end the half—a Gibbons 38-yard field goal and a 12-yard touchdown pass from Gardner to Gallon—making the score 27–13 at halftime. Notre Dame reduced Michigan's lead to seven points in the third quarter on a 20-yard touchdown pass from Rees to Troy Niklas, but Michigan regained its 14-point advantage with a 13-yard touchdown pass from Gardner to Gallon. Notre Dame scored the first ten points of the fourth quarter via a Stephon Tuitt interception in the Michigan endzone for a touchdown and a Brindza 40-yard field goal, making the score 34–30 in favor of Michigan. Michigan, however, would score the final points of the game on a four-yard touchdown pass from Gardner to Drew Dileo.

The game's announced attendance was 115,109, making it the largest crowd ever to watch an American football game (college or NFL). Gardner accounted for 376 yards of Michigan's offense, the ninth highest single-game performance by a Michigan player. The only two Michigan players to contribute more total yards in a single game are Denard Robinson and John Navarre. Wide receiver Jeremy Gallon caught eight passes for 184 yards and three touchdowns, while rushing for 14 yards. Gallon's 184 receiving yards against Notre Dame is tied for the sixth highest single-game performance in Michigan history. On defense, cornerback Blake Countess had two interceptions for Michigan, the first two of his career, and became the first Michigan player to have two interceptions in a game since James Rogers against Purdue in 2010. Raymon Taylor recorded a career-high eleven tackles in the game. The win was Michigan's 400th victory at Michigan Stadium and improved its record against Notre Dame to 24–16–1. Gibbons' first-quarter field goal—his 15th straight made field goal attempt—broke the Michigan record for most consecutive field goals made. Remy Hamilton previously held the record. Stephen M. Ross, who donated $200 million to the University of Michigan earlier in the week, was named an honorary captain for the game. In recognition of his performance in the game, Gallon was named the Big Ten's Offensive Player of the Week. Gardner was named Davey O'Brien Quarterback of the Week and one of eight Manning Award Stars of the Week for his 5 touchdown performance, which included a record-tying 4 passing touchdowns.

References to chickens were a widely reported side story to the game. After Notre Dame announced one year earlier that it would terminate the rivalry after the 2014 season, Michigan head coach Brady Hoke said Notre Dame was "chickening out" of the rivalry. When ESPN commentator Lee Corso made his pick for the game during the College GameDay show (which was in Ann Arbor for the game), he brought out several live chickens while picking Notre Dame to win the game, and fans in the background carried signs with poultry references, including "Cluck of the Irish." At the end Michigan's 41–30 victory, in what Chantel Jennings of ESPN.com called the "Dig of the Day", the speakers at Michigan Stadium loudly played the "Chicken Dance" as Michigan fans "danced in the stands."

vs. Akron

Sources:

    
    
    
    
    
    
    

Following the game against Notre Dame, Michigan hosted the Akron Zips. This was the first meeting between the two teams.

Michigan avoided a massive upset with a goal line stand at the end of the game, ensuring a 28–24 victory. Michigan opened the scoring in the first quarter with a 48-yard touchdown pass from Devin Gardner to Devin Funchess, but Akron responded with a 45-yard field goal from Robert Stein. Following a scoreless second quarter, Michigan led 7–3 at halftime. Akron opened the scoring in the third quarter with a 28-yard touchdown from Kyle Pohl to Zach D'Orazio, but Michigan responded with two touchdowns of its own—a Gardner 36-yard run and a 33-yard pass from Gardner to Jehu Chesson—giving Michigan a 21–10 lead. Akron responded with 14 points of its own—a Justin March 27-yard interception return for a touchdown and a one-yard touchdown pass from Pohl to Tyrell Goodman—to take a 24–21 lead. Michigan regained the lead and ended the scoring with a two-yard touchdown run from Fitzgerald Toussaint.

Gardner recorded 103 rushing yards, which set a new career high. Brendan Gibbons missed a 45-yard field goal in the second quarter, which ended his streak of 16 consecutive made field goals. Blake Countess recorded his second straight game with an interception, while Jarrod Wilson recorded his first career interception. Akron became the 145th school to play Michigan in a football game, with Michigan's record improving to 116–25–4 in games when facing a new opponent.

at UConn

Sources:

    
    
    
    
    
    

Following its near-upset from Akron, Michigan traveled to East Hartford to face the Connecticut (UConn) Huskies. In the previous meeting in 2010—the rededication of Michigan Stadium—Michigan defeated Connecticut 30–10.

Michigan won its second close game in two weeks, scoring 17 unanswered points to defeat UConn 24–21 after falling behind 21–7 in the third quarter. Michigan scored the only points of the first quarter via a Devin Gardner 17-yard touchdown. UConn responded with 14 unanswered points in the second quarter to take a 14–7 lead at halftime: an 11-yard touchdown pass from Chandler Whitmer to Spencer Parker and a seven-yard touchdown pass from Whitmer to Lyle McCombs. UConn opened the scoring in the third quarter when Ty-Meer Brown returned a Gardner fumble 34 yards for a touchdown, making the score 21–7 UConn. Michigan responded by scoring the final 17 points, a 35-yard touchdown run from Fitzgerald Toussaint in the third quarter, a 12-yard touchdown run from Toussaint in the fourth quarter, and a 21-yard field goal from Brendan Gibbons, which also occurred in the fourth quarter.

The attendance of 42,704 was the largest crowd in the history of Rentschler Field. Toussaint carried the ball 24 times for a total of 120 rushing yards, his first effort over 100 yards since the game against Ohio State in 2011. Frank Clark recorded two sacks in the game, his first multi-sack game of his career. Desmond Morgan recorded his first career interception, while Chris Wormley and Raymon Taylor both recorded their first career sacks. Michigan's defense only allowed 206 yards of total offense and held UConn to one successful third down conversion out of eleven attempts.

vs. Minnesota

Sources:

    
    
    
    
    
    
    
    

After its trip to Connecticut, Michigan faced the Minnesota Golden Gophers. In the previous meeting, Michigan dominated Minnesota and won by a score of 35–13.

Michigan again dominated Minnesota, winning 42–13. The teams traded touchdowns in the first quarter, with Michigan scoring on an eight-yard touchdown run from Fitzgerald Toussaint and Minnesota responding with a seven-yard touchdown pass from Mitch Leidner to Maxx Williams. Michigan scored the only points of the second quarter on a 24-yard touchdown pass from Devin Garder to Devin Funchess, giving Michigan a 14–7 lead at halftime. Michigan scored the first points of the third quarter on a two-yard touchdown run from Derrick Green, but Minnesota responded with a 44-yard field goal from Chris Hawthorne. Michigan responded with a 12-yard touchdown run from Toussaint. Minnesota opened the scoring in the fourth quarter with a 27-yard field goal from Hawthorne to make the score 28–13, but Michigan scored the final 14 points of the game via a two-yard touchdown run from Devin Gardner and a 72-yard interception return for a touchdown from Blake Countess.

The game was Michigan's first game without a turnover since its 2011 meeting with Minnesota, and the first time Gardner had started a game as a quarterback without throwing at least one interception. Graham Glasgow replaced Jack Miller as the team's starting center, while Chris Bryant replaced Glasgow as the team's left guard. Michigan's offense did not attempt a pass during the first quarter of the game. Blake Countess's interception in the fourth quarter was his fourth of the season; he became the first Wolverine since Donovan Warren in 2009 to have four interceptions in a season.

at Penn State

Sources:

    
    
    
    
    
    
    
    
    
    
    
    
    
    
    

Following its game against Minnesota, Michigan traveled to State College to face the Penn State Nittany Lions for the first time since 2010. In the previous meeting, Penn State won by a score of 41–31.

Penn State won the game, defeating Michigan 43–40 after four overtime periods. Penn State opened the scoring in the first quarter with a 12-yard touchdown pass from Christian Hackenberg to Brandon Felder. Michigan responded with a 59-yard touchdown pass from Devin Gardner to Devin Funchess and a 47-yard field goal from Brendan Gibbons, which gave Michigan a 10–7 lead after the first quarter. Penn State responded in the second quarter with 14 unanswered points, via a 20-yard touchdown pass from Hackenberg to Jesse James and a 24-yard touchdown pass from Hackenberg to Felder, making the score 21–10 in favor of Penn State at halftime. Michigan responded with the first ten points of the third quarter. Frank Clark recovered a Penn State fumble and returned it 24 yards for a touchdown, while Gibbons added a 23-yard to make the score 21–20 in favor of Penn State. Penn State responded with a 45-yard field goal from Sam Ficken, but Michigan regained the lead via a 16-yard touchdown pass from Gardner to Jeremy Gallon. In the fourth quarter, Michigan added to its lead with a 37-yard touchdown pass from Gardner to Funchess, making the score 34–24. Penn State scored the next ten points—a 43-yard field goal from Ficken and a one-yard run from Hackenberg—to tie the game and send it to overtime. Neither team scored in the first overtime. In the second overtime, Gibbons kicked a 25-yard field goal for Michigan, but Penn State responded with a 36-yard field goal from Ficken. After neither team scored in the third overtime, Gibbons gave Michigan a three-point lead with a 40-yard field goal in the fourth overtime, but Penn State responded with a two-yard touchdown run from Bill Belton to win the game.

The game was the longest in Michigan football history, surpassing triple overtime victories against Michigan State in 2004 and Illinois in 2010. Devin Funchess recorded over 100 receiving yards for the second consecutive week. Frank Clark recorded two sacks and two fumble recoveries, as well as a defensive touchdown, giving Michigan its second consecutive week with a defensive touchdown. Jake Ryan played for the first time since his ACL injury in the spring. Brendan Gibbons recorded his 127th consecutive point after touchdown (PAT), setting a new Michigan record and passing JD Carlson in the process. Desmond Morgan recorded eight tackles during the game.

vs. Indiana

Sources:

    
    
    
    
    
    
    
    
    
    
    
    
    
    
    
    

After its trip to State College, Michigan hosted the Indiana Hoosiers for the first time since 2010. Michigan won the previous game by a score of 42–35.

The game turned into a shootout, with Michigan winning 63–47. Indiana opened the scoring in the first quarter via a 59-yard touchdown pass from Nate Sudfeld to Cody Latimer. Michigan responded with a 13-yard touchdown run from Devin Gardner and then took the lead via a two-yard touchdown run from Fitzgerald Toussaint. Michigan added to its lead in the second quarter via a seven-yard touchdown run from Toussaint, but Indiana responded with a 33-yard touchdown pass from Tre Roberson to Shane Wynn, cutting Michigan's lead to seven points. Michigan added a 21-yard touchdown pass from Gardner to Jeremy Gallon, but as time expired in the half, Mitch Ewald kicked a 50-yard field goal, making the score 28–17 in favor of Michigan at halftime. The teams combined to score 37 points in the third quarter. Indiana cut Michigan's lead to four with a two-yard touchdown run from Tevin Coleman, but Michigan responded with a 50-yard touchdown pass from Gardner to Gallon. Indiana answered with a five-yard touchdown pass from Roberson to Wynn and then reduced Michigan's lead to one point with a 23-yard field goal from Ewald. Michigan answered with a one-yard touchdown run from Toussaint, but Indiana responded with a 67-yard touchdown pass from Roberson to Kofi Hughes, making the score 42–40 in favor of Michigan. In the fourth quarter, Michigan responded with a six-yard touchdown run from Gardner, but Indiana answered with a 15-yard touchdown run from Tre Roberson. Michigan once again extended its lead to nine points with a six-yard touchdown run from Gardner and then ended the scoring with a 27-yard touchdown run from Toussaint.

Jeremy Gallon broke the single-game receiving record for both Michigan and the Big Ten Conference during the game, catching 14 passes for a total of 369 yards. Gardner broke Michigan's single game records for both passing yards (503) and total offense (584). Michigan's offense set a new school record for total yardage with 751 yards of offense, breaking the previous record of 727 yards against Delaware State in 2009. Thomas Gordon recorded his first two interceptions of the season during the game. With the win, Michigan became bowl eligible.

at Michigan State

Sources:

    
    
    
    
    
    
    

Following its clash with Indiana, Michigan traveled to East Lansing to face its in-state rival, the Michigan State Spartans. Michigan won the previous game 12–10 on a last second field goal from Brendan Gibbons.

Michigan State dominated the game, winning 29–6. Michigan opened the scoring in the first quarter via a 49-yard field goal from Matt Wile, but Michigan State responded with a field goal of its own—a 40-yard one from Michael Geiger. In the second quarter, Michigan State took the lead on a 44-yard field goal from Geiger, but Michigan responded with a 34-yard field goal from Brendan Gibbons. Michigan State regained the lead on a 14-yard touchdown pass from Connor Cook to Bennie Fowler. After leading 13–6 at halftime, Michigan State scored all points that occurred after halftime. In the third quarter, Geiger added a 35-yard field goal to give Michigan State a 16–6 lead. In the fourth quarter, Michigan State added two touchdowns via a one-yard touchdown run from Connor Cook and a 40-yard touchdown run from Jeremy Langford.

Michigan rushed for −48 yards, which was a school record for the lowest total rushing yards in a single game. Michigan fell to 35–24–2 when the two teams played games involving the Paul Bunyan Trophy.

vs. Nebraska

Sources:

    
    
    
    
    

After its trip to East Lansing, Michigan hosted the Nebraska Cornhuskers. The previous meeting saw Michigan lose starting quarterback Denard Robinson to injury in the first half and it eventually lost the game 23–9.

Nebraska defeated Michigan 17–13 in a low-scoring affair. Nebraska opened the scoring in the first quarter via a 21-yard field goal from Pat Smith and an eight-yard run from Ameer Abdullah. Michigan responded in the second quarter with a 27-yard field goal from Brendan Gibbons, giving Nebraska a 10–3 lead at halftime. Michigan tied the game in the third quarter with a 5-yard touchdown pass from Devin Gardner to Devin Funchess, and then took the lead in the fourth quarter via a 40-yard field goal from Gibbons. Nebraska responded with a five-yard touchdown pass from Tommy Armstrong to Abdullah to win the game.

The loss was Michigan's first at Michigan Stadium since Brady Hoke became the head coach in 2011. Both Dennis Norfleet and Chris Wormley recorded their first career fumble recoveries. The attendance of 112,204 marked the 250th consecutive game Michigan Stadium has seen crowds of over 100,000 people.

at Northwestern

Sources:

    
    
    
    
    
    
    
    
    
    

Following its game against Nebraska, Michigan traveled to Evanston to face the Northwestern Wildcats. Michigan won the previous meeting 38–31 in overtime.

Michigan stunned Northwestern with a last second field goal to tie the game, and then won in triple overtime by a score of 27–19. The teams traded field goals in the first quarter, with Michigan scoring first via a 25-yard field goal from Brendan Gibbons, while Northwestern responded with a 40-yard field goal from Jeff Budzien. Northwestern scored the only points of the second quarter via a 22-yard field goal from Budzien and led 6–3 at halftime. Northwestern also scored the only points of the third quarter via a 29-yard field goal from Budzien to take a 9–3 lead. Michigan responded with two field goals from Brendan Gibbons—one from 28 yards and one from 44 yards, with the second one coming as time expired. The teams traded touchdowns in the first overtime, with Michigan scoring via an 11-yard touchdown pass from Devin Gardner to Jake Butt, while Kain Colter scored via a one-yard run for Northwestern. The teams traded field goals in the second overtime. Jeff Budzien kicked a 36-yard field goal for Northwestern, while Brendan Gibbons added a 29-yard field goal for Michigan. Michigan won the game in the third overtime via a 5-yard touchdown run from Gardner, converting a two-point attempt via a Gardner run, and then stopping Northwestern's offense during Northwestern's attempt.

Michigan improved its record to 9–2 in games that were decided in overtime. Jake Butt's touchdown in the first overtime was his first career touchdown. Jeremy Gallon became the school's tenth player to record 1,000 receiving yards in a season and the first since Mario Manningham did so in 2007.

at Iowa

Sources:

    
    
    
    
    
    

After its game against Northwestern, Michigan completed its road portion of the schedule against the Iowa Hawkeyes. Michigan dominated the previous meeting, winning 42–17, with Devin Gardner accounting for all six of Michigan's touchdowns.

Iowa won the game by a score of 24–21. Michigan opened the scoring in the first quarter with a seven-yard interception return for a touchdown from Brennan Beyer, but Iowa responded with a five-yard touchdown pass from Jake Rudock to CJ Fiedorowicz. Michigan scored the next fourteen points via a two-yard pass from Devin Gardner to A.J. Williams and a nine-yard pass from Gardner to Jeremy Gallon, giving Michigan a 21–7 lead at halftime. Iowa scored the next 17 points to win the game. In the third quarter, Jake Rudock completed a 55-yard touchdown pass to Tevaun Smith, cutting Michigan's lead to seven points. In the fourth quarter, Mark Weisman tied the game via a nine-yard touchdown run, and Mike Myer gave Iowa the victory with a 34-yard field goal.

The temperature at kickoff was 18 °F. Frank Clark had 2.5 tackles for a loss, while Michigan intercepted three passes and had its third defensive touchdown of the season. Blake Countess recorded his fifth interception of the season, while Raymon Taylor recorded his fourth interception of the season.

vs. Ohio State

Sources:

    
    
    
    
    
    
    
    
    
    
    

Following its road finale against Iowa, Michigan faced Ohio State in the 110th meeting of "The Game". Ohio State won the previous edition 26–21.

Ohio State won a thrilling contest 42–41 after Michigan missed a go-ahead two-point conversion attempt with 32 seconds remaining in the game. The teams combined for 28 points in the first quarter. Michigan opened the scoring via a one-yard touchdown run from Devin Gardner, but Ohio State responded with a 53-yard touchdown pass from Braxton Miller to Devin Smith. Michigan regained the lead via a four-yard touchdown run from Fitzgerald Toussaint, but Ohio State responded with a 53-yard touchdown run from Miller. Michigan regained the lead in the second quarter via a 17-yard touchdown pass from Devin Gardner to Jeremy Gallon, but Ohio State responded with a 21-yard touchdown run from Braxton Miller, making the score 21–21 at halftime. In the third quarter, Ohio State took the lead for the first time in the game, with Braxton Miller scoring on a 3-yard touchdown run. Ohio State added to its lead via a 22-yard touchdown pass from Miller to Jeff Heuerman, making the score 35–21 in favor of Ohio State at the end of the third quarter. In the fourth quarter, Michigan responded with an 11-yard touchdown pass from Gardner to Drew Dileo and a two-yard pass from Gardner to Jake Butt, which tied the score at 35. Ohio State regained the lead via a one-yard touchdown run from Carlos Hyde, but Michigan responded with a two-yard touchdown pass from Gardner to Devin Funchess. Instead of attempting the extra point to send the game to overtime, Michigan decided to go for a two-point conversion to win the game in regulation. Gardner's pass was intercepted and Ohio State won its second consecutive game over Michigan.

Devin Gardner completed 32 of his 45 attempted passes for 451 yards and four touchdowns. This was his second career game of over 400 passing yards; he is the only Michigan quarterback to have ever thrown for 400 passing yards in a single game. Gardner's 451 passing yards and Gallon's 175 receiving yards are the most passing and receiving yards ever recorded against Ohio State in the history of the rivalry.

vs. Kansas State

Sources:

For its final game of the season, Michigan faced Kansas State in the Buffalo Wild Wings Bowl. This was the first ever meeting between the two schools. This was Michigan's forty-third bowl game in its history, and the first time it had ever played in the Buffalo Wild Wings Bowl. It was also be the first time Michigan has played in Arizona since the 1986 Fiesta Bowl, when Michigan defeated Nebraska 27–23.

Depth chart
Starters and backups against Central Michigan. Following Drake Johnson's season-ending injury against Central Michigan, Derrick Green replaced him as the backup running back, while Thomas Rawls replaced Justice Hayes as the third-string running back.

Awards
Fifth-year senior offensive tackle Taylor Lewan earned his second consecutive and Michigan's third consecutive Rimington-Pace Offensive lineman of the Year award and tight end Devin Funchess was selected as the  Kwalick-Clark Tight end of the Year. Lewan earned first-team All-Big Ten Conference recognition from both the coaches and the media, while Funchess and Blake Countess were All-Conference first team by the media and second-team honors by the coaches. Jeremy Gallon was a second team selection by both the coaches and the media, while Frank Clark was recognized as second-team by the coaches and honorable mention by the media. Other honorable mention selections were Jibreel Black (coaches and media), Devin Gardner, Brendan Gibbons and Raymon Taylor (media) and Michael Schofield (coaches). Following the season Gallon was selected team MVP.

Lewan was a first team All-American selection by Sporting News, a second team selection by the Associated Press, CBSSports.com, Walter Camp Football Foundation, Sports Illustrated and a third team selection by Athlon Sports. Countess, Funchess and Gallon were honorable mention selections by Sports Illustrated.

All-star games

2014 NFL Draft

In addition to the drafted players both Thomas Gordon (New York Giants) and Fitzgerald Toussaint (Baltimore Ravens) signed contracts as undrafted free agents.

Roster

References

External links

Michigan
Michigan Wolverines football seasons
Michigan Wolverines football